Ilir Kepa (born 21 April 1966 in Shkodër) is an Albanian retired football striker who played for the Albania national team.

Playing career

Club
Kepa played for Vllaznia Shkodër but fled communist Albania on 30 March 1991 alongside six other internationals (among them Rudi Vata), when the left the national team's hotel in Paris right after the European Championship qualification match against France. He ended up in Belgium and joined Hugo Broos' RWDM and stayed for three years. He then had a couple of seasons at French third tier with Louhans-Cuiseaux, before returning to Belgium and finish his career at Olympic Charleroi, for whom he played 51 matches.

International
He made his debut for Albania in a September 1988 friendly match away to Romania and earned a total of 7 caps, scoring 1 goal. His final international was a September 1993 FIFA World Cup qualification match against Spain.

Managerial career
Kepa was appointed coach of reformed RWDM47 in 2007. In 2009 he took charge of the Ganshoren reserves team.

References

External links

1966 births
Living people
Footballers from Shkodër
Albanian footballers
Association football forwards
Albania international footballers
KF Vllaznia Shkodër players
R.W.D. Molenbeek players
Louhans-Cuiseaux FC players
R. Olympic Charleroi Châtelet Farciennes players
Kategoria Superiore players
Belgian Pro League players
Championnat National players
Challenger Pro League players
Belgian Third Division players
Albanian expatriate footballers
Expatriate footballers in Belgium
Expatriate footballers in France
Albanian expatriate sportspeople in Belgium
Albanian expatriate sportspeople in France
Albanian defectors